This is a list of public art in Lake Oswego, Oregon.

Sculpture

 Age of Iron
 Angkor I (1994), Lee Kelly
 The Awe and Wonder
 Anillos, Maria Wickwire
 Bearly About
 Blue Light Tower
 Bread Upon the Water
 Dream
 The Family
 First Footsteps, Jim Demetro
 The Goal
 Going for Your Vision, Alisa Looney
 The Guardian
 In the Flow
 Lotus Tower
 Tidal Pool
 Crows
 Sunrise in the City
 Pinecone Ballards
 Ram's Head Benches
 Spirit of the Marsh
 Stafford Stones
 Sunbathers, Ken Patecky
 Sunflower
 Swoop II
 Time and Space
 Untitled, Bruce West
 Various Works
 Water, Water, Water
 The Way it Is
 Zephyr

Gallery Without Walls 

 Adam, Let's Go for a Bite, Ed Humphries
 August Trunk, Alisa Formway Roe
 Mariposa, Laurel Marie Hagner
 Pouffe, Hilary Pfeifer
 Sprout, Mike Suri
 The Big Maybe, Stashu Smaka

References

Lake Oswego, Oregon
Lake Oswego
Lake Oswego